The Saint Joseph's men's lacrosse team represents Saint Joseph's University in National Collegiate Athletic Association (NCAA) Division I men's lacrosse. The Hawks were elevated to the varsity level in 1992 after competing several years as a club sport.

History
Through the 2022 season, Saint Joseph's competed as a member of the Northeast Conference (NEC). Starting with the upcoming 2023 season, the Hawks will play in the newly established men's lacrosse league of their full-time home of the Atlantic 10 Conference. They play home games at Sweeney Field in Philadelphia.

In 2015, St. Joe's was the number one seed in the NEC year-end tournament, reaching the finals where they lost to Bryant University 10–6.

Since Taylor Wray was hired as head coach in 2012, St. Joe's record has been 98 wins and 60 losses, with 6 first place conference finishes and 5 NEC tournament finals.

St. Joe’s was in the CAA prior to 2014, and in the MAAC prior to 2011.

Annual record

Coaching Records
{| class="wikitable"

|- align="center"

†NCAA canceled 2020 collegiate activities due to the COVID-19 virus

 (1) Laxpower / LaxBytes Power Ratings / Massey Ratings / NCAA RPI
 (2) Defeated Hobart 14-7 in NEC tournament finals. Lost to Yale in NCAA 1st round 18-16.
 (3) Lost NEC tournament finals 16-10 to Bryant.
 (4) Lost NEC tournament finals 9-8 to Robert Morris.
 (5) Lost NEC tournament finals 11-7 to Hobart.
 (6) Lost NEC tournament finals 10-6 to Bryant.

See also
Lacrosse in Pennsylvania

References

External links
 

College men's lacrosse teams in the United States
Lacrosse, men's
Atlantic 10 Conference men's lacrosse
Lacrosse teams in Pennsylvania
1992 establishments in Pennsylvania
Lacrosse clubs established in 1992